The 1936 Nebraska gubernatorial election was held on November 3, 1936, and featured incumbent Governor Robert L. Cochran, a Democrat, defeating Republican nominee, newspaper publisher and former state legislator Dwight Griswold, to win a second two-year term in office. Former State Attorney General Ora S. Spillman unsuccessfully ran for the Republican nomination.

General election

Results

References

Gubernatorial
1936
Nebraska
November 1936 events